This is a list of Tunisian Ligue Professionnelle 1 winning football managers. Faouzi Benzarti has won the tournament on a record nine occasions with Espérance de Tunis, Étoile Sportive du Sahel and Club Africain Youssef Zouaoui have won the title on five occasions.

Seasons and winning managers

Staistcs

Managers with multiple titles

References 

Football in Tunisia
Tunisian Ligue Professionnelle 1
Lists of association football managers